The 2019–20 San Diego Toreros men's basketball team represented the University of San Diego during the 2019–20 NCAA Division I men's basketball season. The Toreros were led by second-year head coach Sam Scholl. They played their home games at Jenny Craig Pavilion in San Diego, California as members of the West Coast Conference. They finished the season 9–23, 2–14 in WCC play to finish in 9th place. They lost in the first round of the WCC tournament to Loyola Marymount.

Previous season
The Toreros finished the 2018–19 season 21–15, 7–9 in WCC play to finish in seventh place. They defeated Portland, Santa Clara and BYU to advanced to the semifinals of the WCC tournament where they lost to Saint Mary's. The Toreros received an at-large bid to the NIT where they lost to Memphis in the first round.

Offseason

Departures

Incoming transfers

2019 recruiting class

Roster

Schedule and results

|-
!colspan=12 style=| Non-conference regular season

|-
!colspan=12 style=| WCC regular season

|-
!colspan=12 style=| WCC tournament

Source:

See also
 2019–20 San Diego Toreros women's basketball team

References

San Diego Toreros men's basketball seasons
San Diego
San Diego Toreros
San Diego Toreros